"Standpatter", or "stand-patter", was a term used in US political history in the early 20th century, during the Progressive Era, to describe the more conservative members of the Republican Party than other members, who were called "insurgents" or "progressives". The former were said to be philosophically similar to those of the earlier Stalwart faction.

History

The term is said to have first been used in a political context by Joseph G. Cannon in 1896 with regard to US tariffs. It was popularised following Senator Mark Hanna's "stand pat speech" in 1901, which suggested that "all that was necessary for Republican victory was, in poker parlance, to stand pat". In poker, a player who does not want to trade any cards declares his intention to "stand pat." A standpatter Republican was particularly conservative and was unwilling to trade or compromise. The poker parlance "stand pat" has since been used in political contexts to refer to a conservative viewpoint although the description of individuals as "standpatters" is less common.

After the term's popularisation, even those unfamiliar with the game of poker understood the description.

Prominent members
Nelson Aldrich
William B. Allison
Joseph Foraker
Mark Hanna
Boies Penrose
Thomas C. Platt
John Coit Spooner

See also
Progressive Era
Glossary of poker terms

External links
James N. Tidwell, Political Words and Phrases: Card-Playing Terms, American Speech Vol. 33, No. 1 (Feb., 1958), pp. 21-28, Duke University Press
"Standpat" at Merriam-Webster

References

Conservative Republican Party politicians
Political terminology of the United States
Republican Party (United States) terminology
Political party factions in the United States
Factions in the Republican Party (United States)
Conservatism in the United States